Qeshlaq-e Chalablu (also Romanized as Qeshlāq-e Chalablū and Qeshlāq Chalablū; also known as Chalablū) is a village in Nur Ali Beyk Rural District, in the Central District of Saveh County, Markazi Province, Iran. At the 2006 census, its population was 396, in 89 families.

References 

Populated places in Saveh County